Genie is a widebody pinball machine designed by Ed Krynski and released in 1979 by Gottlieb. It features a jinn theme and was advertised with the slogans "Gottlieb's WIDE and Beautiful BODY" and "A Wide-Body Pinball absolutely bulging with player appeal and proven massive profit earning capacity!".

Description
Genie is considered Gottlieb's answer to Bally’s super wide pinball machine Paragon and the start of a competition of a “wider is better” pinball design in the late 1970s. A typical game from this era was 22″ (56 cm) wide and 51.5″ (131 cm) long. While Paragon is 28.5″ (73 cm) by 51.5″ (131 cm), Genie has the dimensions of 28.5″ (73 cm) by 55″ (140 cm).

Genie features 5 flippers and an upper mini playfield.

Gameplay
One of the main objectives is to increase the end-of-ball Bonus Value, which can be done by hitting various targets scattered throughout the table. Most drop targets, rollovers, and spot targets increase the Bonus Value by 1,000 points, up to a maximum of 29,000 points. The Bonus Multiplier starts at 1x and can be increased to a maximum of 5x, achieved by hitting one of the four yellow drop targets in the center of the playfield when the "BONUS LIT" light is on. The maximum bonus is 145,000 points.

When the Bonus Value reaches 20,000, a "SCORE BONUS" hole is lit; slotting the ball in this hole scores a bonus and resets the Bonus Value counter.

Extra balls can be earned by either completing all four A-B-C-D rollovers, hitting all red drop targets in the upper playfield, hitting all white drop targets in the upper playfield. Once the player has completed any of these actions, the corresponding spot target will light up. Hitting a lit spot target rewards the player with an extra ball.

Design team
 Game Design: Ed Krynski
 Artwork: Gordon Morison

Digital versions
Genie is available as a licensed table of The Pinball Arcade for several platforms, where is an option to set 3 or 5 balls per game. The game is also an included in the Pinball Hall of Fame: The Gottlieb Collection.

See also
Tales of the Arabian Nights (pinball)

References

External links
 

1979 pinball machines
Gottlieb pinball machines